The Bilecik train collision happened on 3 January 2010, when two passenger trains collided in Bilecik, Turkey. One person was killed and seven people were injured.

Two passenger trains were involved in a collision at Bilecik, Turkey when one train ran into the rear of another. One train driver was killed and seven passengers were injured. Both trains were travelling from Istanbul to Eskişehir. The second train passed a signal at danger and ran into the rear of the first train, which was stationary at the time.

See also 

 List of rail accidents (2010-2019)

References 

2010 in Turkey
Railway accidents in 2010
Train collisions in Turkey
History of Bilecik Province
Railway accidents involving a signal passed at danger
Accidents and incidents involving Turkish State Railways